CICS is the Customer Information Control System, a transaction server that runs primarily on IBM mainframes.

CICS may also refer to:

 Canadian Intergovernmental Conference Secretariat
 CICS, the Center for Information Convergence and Strategy, San Diego State University, California, USA
 CICS-FM, a Canadian radio station
 Chicago International Charter School, Illinois, United States
 CICS Chennai, the Centre for International Co-operation in Science, Tamil Nadu, India
 the CICS-ICCS, International Catholic Conference of Scouting (CICS, Conférence Internationale du Scoutisme Catholique), Rome, Italia

See also
 CIC (disambiguation)